Variospora cancarixiticola is a species of saxicolous (rock-dwelling), crustose lichen in the family Teloschistaceae. It is found in southeastern Spain, where it grows on cancarixite, a volcanic rock known only to occur in that country.

Taxonomy
The lichen was first formally described in 2000 as a species of Caloplaca by Pere Navarro-Rosinés, José Egea, and Xavier Llimona. There, it was found growing on cancarixite, an alkaline igneous rock of the lamproite group found only in southeast Spain. The lichen is only known to occur at the type locality. The species epithet cancarixiticola refers to the unique substrate. The authors noted its similarity to Caloplaca aurea, and considered it to belong to the subgenus Gasparrinia of genus Caloplaca.

The taxon was transferred to the newly circumscribed genus Variospora in 2013, as part of a molecular phylogenetics-directed reorganisation of the family Teloschistaceae.

Description
Ascospores number eight per ascus, and are colourless, narrowly ellipsoid, and polarilocular (i.e. divided into two compartments), with typical dimensions of 16–22 by 4.5–6 μm.

References

Teloschistales
Lichen species
Lichens described in 2000
Lichens of Europe